Émile Broussais (20 June 1855 - 7 February 1943) was a French politician.

Broussais was born in Paris.  He represented the Radical Party in the Chamber of Deputies from 1910 to 1919.

References

1855 births
1943 deaths
Politicians from Paris
Radical Party (France) politicians
Members of the 10th Chamber of Deputies of the French Third Republic
Members of the 11th Chamber of Deputies of the French Third Republic